Bartow is a census-designated place (CDP) in Pocahontas County, West Virginia, United States.  The population was 111 at the 2010 census.

It has a post office with ZIP code 24920.

Bartow is named for Col. Francis S. Bartow, a Confederate commander who died at the Battle of First Manassas on July 21, 1861. The Battle of Greenbrier River, also known as the Battle of Camp Bartow, took place on October 3, 1861 about one mile (1.6 km) southeast of the present town.

The Camp Bartow Historic District was listed on the National Register of Historic Places in 1995.  Located near Bartow is the Camp Allegheny Historic District, listed in 1990.

References

Census-designated places in Pocahontas County, West Virginia
Census-designated places in West Virginia